is a six-man taiko drumming group.  founded in 1995 by Jin-ichi Hiranuma. The name comes from the city the group is from (Tokyo) along with the Japanese words for group (dageki) and “strike hard” (dan).

One of their main goals is to revive and conserve traditional taiko drumming, such as that heard in imperial palaces, with their focus on the various sizes and styles of these drums from the odaiko to the shime-daiko. However, they have experimented with adding other elements to the traditional rhythms, both to modernize and experiment with what the drums can do. Despite the name not all the drumming is loud. There are more subtle performances as well as accompaniment by other instruments such as flutes, cowbells, gongs and vocals. The group has collaborated with Chinese percussionist Meng Xiao Liang, tomback drummer Esfandiar Lali of Iran and vocalist Sergio Vargas of the Dominican Republic.

Tokyo Dagekidan first performed publicly with the Japanese Drumming Concert sponsored by the National Theater of Japan. They perform at various taiko festivals, as well as cultural and educational events around Japan. Abroad, the group has performed in countries such as Indonesia (1996), tours of France and Africa in 2000, Europe (U.K., Belgium, Finland and Germany) in 2000, Russia (2003), toured the Caribbean in 2004 (Barbados, Cuba and Dominican Republic), toured Thailand, Malaysia and Brunei in 2007. They  played representing Japan at the closing ceremonies of the 1998 FIFA World Cup in France. In 2012 and 2014, the group toured various cultural festivals in Mexico and inaugurated the Festival Internacional Cervantino, a performance attended by Prince Fumihito Akishino and his wife Kiko.

Tokyo Dagekidan also appeared in Kyoki no Sakura, a film produced by Toei.

Members 
 Murayama Jiro on Bansuri
 Tomofumi Tagawa on Taiko
 Kato Takuya on Taiko
 Yokoyama Ryosuke on Taiko
 Tsuyuki Kazuhiro on Taiko
 Sato Akihiro on Taiko
 Hasegawa Toru  Taiko (alternate)

References

1995 in Japanese music
Musical groups from Tokyo
Performing groups established in 1995
Japanese traditional music